Laura Kidd is a record producer, songwriter and multi-instrumentalist releasing music and podcast episodes as Penfriend, and formerly known as She Makes War. After releasing four full length albums between 2010 and 2018, She Makes War was formally disbanded in December 2019, and she launched new music project Penfriend in May 2020, with accompanying weekly podcast series Attention Engineer. Her collaboration project with Rat (Ned's Atomic Dustbin), Obey Robots, launched in December 2020.

Penfriend

Multi-disciplinary solo project Penfriend launched on 1 May 2020 with an invitation to join The Correspondent's Club, Kidd's handmade member's club set up to provide an online space for music fans.

In May 2021, Kidd released her first record as Penfriend. Exotic Monsters reached #24 in Official UK album chart and #5 in the independent chart.

Attention Engineer podcast

Kidd's podcast series on creativity, grit and determination launched on 3 June 2020, featuring conversations with other artists, musical and otherwise. Described as "a lovely listen...As a musician herself, Kidd...talks with insight and warmth...but these are not the back-slapping all-slebs-together podcasts that we’ve become used to" (The Observer).

Guests include Tanya Donelly (Belly / The Breeders) and Mark Chadwick (Levellers), who appeared as guest vocalists on Kidd's third She Makes War album, "Direction Of Travel", plus Ayse Hassan (Savages), Frank Turner, Charlotte Hatherley, Bernard Butler, Corin Tucker, Robin Ince, Lou Barlow, Shingai and more.

She Makes War

Launched in 2009 with the release of EP "Three...Two...One", She Makes War was Kidd's first solo project. Her fourth album, Brace For Impact, was released in October 2018 and secured a no. 15 UK Independent Albums Chart placement on 12 October 2018. She has released three previous albums Disarm (2010), Little Battles (2012) and Direction Of Travel (2016). The project finished with the release of And Peace in 2019, intimate re-recordings of eight tracks spanning all four albums.

She Makes War's indie rock sound combined grunge riffs with orchestral soundscapes. John Robb described Kidd in 2011 as "a modern musical Boudica", and Will Butler wrote in 2015 that she possessed "The emotional resonance of Elliott Smith colliding with the barbed vigour of Sleater-Kinney" (Gigwise).

In 2015, She Makes War released Disarm: 15 an EP of "tender reworking of songs" from the first album. She Makes War's first two albums Disarm (2010) and Little Battles (2012), share stories from the personal to the political, dealing with matters of love, loss, birth, therapy, murder, abandonment, and hope.

In 2016, She Makes War's third album Direction of Travel featured guest appearances from Tanya Donelly and Mark Chadwick. Kidd played most of the instruments herself, with guests including Clive Deamer and Andy Sutor on drums, The McCarricks and Nicole Robson on strings, and Cajita on piano. The album was produced by Kidd and mixed by Dan Austin (Doves/Pixies). Tanya Donelly's (Breeders, Throwing Muses, Belly), guest appearance on the song 'Paper Thin' was described as "the perfect augmentation to Laura’s beautiful lyrics". Tanya Donelly also features in the music video for the song.

Kidd ended the She Makes War project in 2019, citing a desire to “keep putting out the most honest, thoughtful and brave music I have inside me long into the future”

Touring

As She Makes War, Kidd toured extensively in the UK and Europe both as a solo act and with a full band. She also supported Suede, The Levellers, British Sea Power, Ginger Wildheart, Tune-Yards, Gruff Rhys, The Magic Numbers, Duke Special, Midge Ure, New Model Army, Glen Matlock and Earl Slick, Nadine Shah, Erica Nockalls and Miles Hunt, Chris Helme, Drugstore and The Posies.

Kidd has also toured, providing bass and vocals, for artists including Tricky, Viv Albertine, Lil' Chris, The Penelopes, The Young Punx and Alex Parks.

Other projects
In 2015, Kidd wrote and performed one-woman show Shit Girlfriend at Edinburgh Fringe, combining humorous spoken word and melancholy music performance, sharing tales of real life on the road and Kidd's ill-fated attempts at finding love along the way. Her show was described by The List  as 'a charming hour of biographical storytelling and music…perfectly executed acoustic gems'

Discography

Albums
Obey Robots
 One In A Thousand, 2023 (#14 Official UK Chart)

Penfriend
 Exotic Monsters, 2021 (#24 Official UK Chart)

She Makes War
 Disarm, 2010
 Little Battles, 2012
 Direction of Travel, 2016
 Brace for Impact, 2018
 And Peace, 2019

EPs
 Three...Two...One.., 2009
 Disarm: The Live EP, 2010
 The Butterflies Audiovisual EP, 2013
 Disarm: 15 EP, 2015

Singles
She Makes War
"Let This Be", 2010
"I Am", 2010
"In This Boat", 2012
"Minefields", 2012
"Never Was", 2013
"Drown Me Out", 2016
"Paper Thin", 2016
"Cold Shoulder", 2016
"Stargazing", 2016
"I Want My Country Back", 2017
"Do You Really Want To Hurt Me", 2018
"Devastate Me", 2018
"Undone \ London Bites", 2018

Penfriend
"Everything Looks Normal In The Sunshine", 2020
”The Only Way Out Is Through”, 2020
”Exotic Monsters”, 2021
”Cancel Your Hopes”, 2021
”Black Car”, 2021

Obey Robots
"Let It Snow", 2020
"Inside Out", 2021

References

External links 
 Penfriend HQ
 She Makes War
 
 

British indie rock musicians
English pop musicians
English house musicians
English songwriters
English record producers
Musicians from London
Musicians from Bristol